An analyte, component (in clinical chemistry), titrand (in titrations), or chemical species is a substance or chemical constituent that is of interest in an analytical procedure. The purest substances are referred to as analytes, such as 24 karat gold, NaCl, water, etc. In reality, no substance has been found to be 100% pure in its quality, so a substance that is found to be most pure (for some metals, 99% after electrolysis) is called an analyte.

See also
Analytical chemistry
Immunoassay
Magnetic immunoassay

References 

Analytical chemistry